Esa Pakarinen Jr. (born December 12, 1947) is a Finnish actor.

Biography
He is the son of actor Esa Pakarinen, known for his roles as Pekka Puupää in the Pekka and Pätkä films. Like his father, Esa Pakarinen Jr. has acted in Finnish films. Pakarinen has also made a special contribution to the development of Finnish puppet theater as both an actor and a director.

After graduating from the Helsinki Theatre Academy, Pakarinen first worked at the Joensuu City Theater in Joensuu, after which he moved to the Kotka City Theatre in Kotka and Helsinki City Theatre. After the drama theater season, Pakarinen turned to puppet theater. In 1989, Pakarinen moved back to his childhood town of Varkaus, where he performed his own solo puppet theater. Pakarinen has also studied to be a reflexologist.

Pakarinen was granted an State's Artist Pension in 2014.

Selected filmography
 The Year of the Hare (Jäniksen vuosi, 1977)
 Poet and Muse (Runoilija ja muusa, 1978)
 The Test-tube Adult and Simo's Angels (Koeputkiaikuinen ja Simon enkelit, 1979)
 Sign of the Beast (Pedon merkki, 1981)
 That Kiljunen Family (Kiljusen herrasväki, 1981)
 Jon (1983)
 The Home Street (Kotikatu, 1995–2012)

References

External links 
 

1947 births
Living people
Finnish male comedians
Finnish male film actors
People from Varkaus
Puppeteers